Fort Hartsuff State Historical Park is a state park located  southeast of Burwell, Nebraska, preserving a typical U.S. Army cavalry outpost of the late 19th century. Fort Hartsuff was active from 1874 to 1881. Among its surviving original structures are the post headquarters, enlisted men’s barracks, officers’ quarters, commanding officers quarters, and post hospital; other buildings have been reconstructed.

History
Fort Hartsuff was named in honor of George Lucas Hartsuff, a graduate of West Point who was wounded in action in 1855 during the Florida Seminole Indian War, and who also later rose to the rank of major-general of volunteers during the American Civil War.

References

External links

Fort Hartsuff State Historical Park Nebraska Game and Parks Commission
Fort Hartsuff State Historical Park Map Nebraska Game and Parks Commission
 Friends of Fort Hartsuff State Historical Park

State parks of Nebraska
Protected areas established in 1961
Protected areas of Garfield County, Nebraska
Museums in Garfield County, Nebraska
Military and war museums in Nebraska
Living museums in Nebraska
1874 establishments in Nebraska
1961 establishments in Nebraska